Bjørnar Vestøl (born May 28, 1974 in Oslo) is a Norwegian former professional racing cyclist. He competed in the men's individual road race at the 2000 Summer Olympics. He also rode in the 2000 Giro d'Italia and finished 125th overall.

Major results

1997
 1st Stage 2 Tour of Sweden
 2nd Road race, National Road Championships
1998
 3rd Overall Ster der Beloften
1st Stage 3
1999
 1st Grand Prix de la Ville de Lillers
 1st Stage 1 Ringerike GP
 1st Stage 6 Tour de Langkawi
 2nd Time trial, National Road Championships
 3rd Overall Prudential Tour
 10th Grand Prix Herning
2000
 1st Ronde van Noord-Holland
 1st Stage 7 Circuito Montañes
 National Road Championships
2nd Road race
2nd Time trial
2001
 1st Rund um Düren
 1st Stage 5 Hessen Rundfahrt
 2nd Kampioenschap van Vlaanderen
 8th Druivenkoers Overijse
2002
 3rd Time trial, National Road Championships
 6th A Travers le Morbihan
 10th Le Samyn
2003
 3rd Time trial, National Road Championships
 5th GP Stad Zottegem

References

External links
 
 

1974 births
Living people
Norwegian male cyclists
Norwegian track cyclists
Cyclists from Oslo
Olympic cyclists of Norway
Cyclists at the 2000 Summer Olympics